The President's Task Force on Private Sector Initiatives was created on 14 October 1981 by former U.S. President Ronald Reagan, to advise the President, the Secretary of Commerce, and other Executive agency heads on:
 Methods of developing, supporting and promoting private sector leadership and responsibility for meeting public needs.
 Recommendations for appropriate action by the President to foster greater public-private partnerships and to decrease dependence on government.
The President's Task Force on Private Sector Initiatives was established by President Regan in 1981 to help encourage more private contributions of both human and financial resources to the progress of America's communities.  Chaired by C. William Verity, Jr. the Task Force included 44 members and 11 committees.  The Committee on Marshalling Human Resources, Frank Pace, Jr., chairman, set an agenda to encourage increased commitment, recruitment, placement, and management of volunteers in community service and to enhance the atmosphere for volunteering.  VOLUNTEERS; A VALUABLE RESOURCE was prepared by the committee specifically for the use of policy makers.  The development of the publication was directed by Susan C. Kudlow, on loan from Call For Action, Inc., and was written by Thomazine Shanahan.  December 1982. 

Journal of Community Action Vol. 1, No. 4 1982 Community Partnerships; Perspectives on Partnerships; C. William Verity, Jr., William Aramony, Hon. Pierre DuPont IV, William White, E. Morgan Williams.  

Investing in America:  Initiatives for Community and Economic Development - Throughout the world the United States is recognized for two traditions:  entrepreneurship and civic spirit.  This unique book speaks to the opportunities offered by blending these traditions..... C. William Verity, Jr., Chairman, President's Task Force on Private Sector Initiatives 1982

The task force was terminated 31 Dec 1982, as mandated in the Executive Order which created it.

References
Andrew E Busch. Ronald Reagan and the Politics of Freedom. Rowman and Littlefield Publishers Inc. 2001. . Pages 163, 164 and 288.
The Code of Federal Regulations of the United States of America. Title 3: The President. Revised as of 1 January 1982: 1981 compilation parts 100 and 101. Pages 187 et seq.
Denise M Allard (ed). "*4036* President's Task Force on Private Sector Initiatives": Encyclopedia of Governmental Advisory Organisations 1986–87. Fifth Edition. Gale Research Company. . Section 8. Page 738. Google Books.
Peter Dobkin Hall. Inventing the Non-Profit Sector and Other Essays on Philanthropy, Voluntarism, and Nonprofit Organizations. The Johns Hopkins University Press. Baltimore and London. 1992. . Pages 80, 89, 303 and 332.
Marvin Olasky. "Reagan's Second Thoughts on Corporate Giving". Fortune. 20 September 1983.

Task forces
Private Sector Initiatives, President's Task Force on
Presidency of Ronald Reagan